Bonsaaso is a village in the Amansie South District in the Ashanti Region of Ghana. It is the only village in Ghana to benefit from the Millennium Villages Project.

References 

Villages in Ghana